Skylake or Sky Lake may refer to:

 Skylake (microarchitecture), the codename for a processor microarchitecture developed by Intel as the successor to Broadwell
 Skylake (Mysia), a town of ancient Mysia, now in Turkey
 Sky Lake, Florida, US
 Skylake Airport, the former name of Skydive Houston Airport, Texas, US